Scorpiopsis exanthistis is a moth in the family Depressariidae. It was described by Edward Meyrick in 1930. It is found in New Guinea.

The wingspan is about 14 mm. The forewings are pale yellow, reticulated throughout orange red and with a fuscous costal streak from the base to the middle, the costal edge of this blackish with a white mark before the middle. There is a spot of fuscous suffusion on the end of the cell, where a vague streak of suffusion runs to a fuscous mark on the costa at three-fourths. There is also a fuscous terminal streak, including some yellowish dots. The hindwings are pale yellowish.

References

Moths described in 1930
Depressariinae